Xylocopa valga is a species of carpenter bee common to: western, central and southern Europe, except for far northern latitudes; the Caucasus; Middle East; Central Asia; and Mongolia. The species has become extinct in Latvia and Lithuania.

Description
This solitary bee has a black and blue coloured body, 20–27 mm in length, and densely covered with purple hairs. The small wings also have a purple tint. The bee creates cavity nests by gnawing the wood in the trunks of dead trees and in old wooden structures. It inhabits both forests and urban areas.

References

valga
Hymenoptera of Asia
Hymenoptera of Europe
Insects of the Middle East
Insects of Afghanistan
Insects of China
Insects of Iran
Insects of Mongolia
Insects of Pakistan
Insects of Turkey
Insects of Central Asia
Fauna of East Asia
Fauna of Western Asia
Insects described in 1872
Taxobox binomials not recognized by IUCN